Wreake Valley Academy (formerly Wreake Valley Community College) is a co-educational secondary school with academy status in Syston, Leicestershire, England. The school is known locally just as 'Wreake' or 'Wreake Valley', which is the name of the geographical area.

The college
Wreake Valley Academy is an 11-18 co-educational school in Syston, Leicestershire, England. Despite its ship-like appearance, the building was actually inspired by Ziggurats and is now a listed building. In April 2020 Tim Marston took over as Headteacher.

The sixth form
Students in England have the option to leave school aged 16, once completing their GCSEs.
It is optional for students to 'stay-on' in further education. The college's sixth form has grown in recent years, in 2005 there were only 71 students taking their A2 exams. In September 2004 the college, in an attempt to increase Post 16 numbers such as GNVQs. Many students progress to higher education and each year a number of students gain admission to prestigious Universities e.g. Oxbridge, Imperial College London and Warwick and courses such as medicine, veterinary medicine, economics and law.

The sixth form has its own area within the college, where only adults, students, sixth formers and staff are permitted to visit. Within this area are a number of classrooms varying in size and a quiet study area. There is also a common room for sixth form students to enjoy during break and lunch times or during free/study periods.

Students in the sixth form may take part in a number of extra-curricula activities, including Young Enterprise, Community Sports Leadership Award, many sports clubs e.g. football, rugby union and basketball.

Wreake Valley Community College has its own Proscenium stage on which Wreake Valley's students have performed in a variety of shows including Les Misérables (2008), RENT (2010) and We Will Rock You (2011).

In 2019 the Sixth Form officially became known as Bradgate Sixth Form.

Extracurricular activities
The Air Training Corps (ATC) was a military-based youth organisation for 13- to 20-year-olds and the local squadron (No 1181 Syston Squadron) was based in the grounds of the academy. It was closed because no volunteer officer could be found to take charge of the squadron

References

External links
School Website
ATC Squadron Website

Academies in Leicestershire
Borough of Charnwood
Educational institutions established in 1971
Secondary schools in Leicestershire
1971 establishments in England